This is a list of vales in England and Wales. Vales are typically, though not universally, broad valleys between areas of higher ground. They may contain one or multiple rivers.

Vale of Belvoir (Nottinghamshire / Leicestershire / Lincolnshire)
Vale of Berkeley (Gloucestershire)
Blackmore Vale or (Blackmoor Vale) (Dorset)
Vale of Catmose (Rutland)
Vale of Clwyd (Welsh: Dyffryn Clwyd) (Denbighshire)
Vale of Conwy (Welsh: Dyffryn Conwy) (Conwy)
Dedham Vale (Essex / Suffolk)
Vale of Eden (Cumbria)
Vale of Evesham (Warwickshire)
Vale of Ffestiniog (Welsh: Dyffryn Maentwrog) (Gwynedd)
Vale of Glamorgan (Welsh: Bro Morgannwg) (Glamorgan)
Vale of Gloucester (Gloucestershire)
Vale of Kent (Kent)
Vale of Leadon (Gloucestershire /Herefordshire)
Marshwood Vale (Dorset)
Vale of Montgomery (Powys  / Shropshire)
Vale of Mowbray (Yorkshire)
Vale of Neath (Welsh: Cwm Nedd) (Glamorgan)
Vale of Pewsey (Wiltshire)
Vale of Pickering (Yorkshire)
Vale of Powis (Powys)
Vale of Red Horse (Warwickshire)
Vale of St Albans (Hertfordshire)
Vale of Sussex (Sussex)
Vale of Taunton (or Vale of Taunton Deane) (Somerset)
Vale of Trent (Derbyshire / Staffordshire)
Vale of Wardour (Wiltshire)
Vale of White Horse (Oxfordshire)
Vale of York (Yorkshire)

References
Names taken from Physical map of Great Britain, sheet 2 (1:625,000 scale map) published in 1957 by Ordnance Survey, except where otherwise noted.

 
Lists of landforms of England
Lists of landforms of Wales